Önnereds HK is a handball club based in Gothenburg, Sweden. Around 60 teams are organized in the club.

Since 1965, handball has been played in the Gothenburg district of Önnered. In 1985, the club was split into a football and a handball department. The handball club moved to the Älvsborg district. In 1992, the ÖHK-hallen was built, which has been the club's home ground since then and now hold up to 1000 spectators. In addition to the large hall, the club also has two smaller ones.

The women's team played in the top Swedish division, the Elitserien, in the 2009/10 season. After being relegated in Summer 2010, they compete in the Allsvenskan. From 2013 to 2016, the team appeared again in the Elitserien. After a season in the Allsvenskan, the women's team were promoted once again. The men's team were also promoted to the Handbollsligan in 2013, in which the team competed until 2015. In 2018, they returned to the Handbollsligan.

References

External links
 

Swedish handball clubs
Sport in Gothenburg
1985 establishments in Sweden
Handball clubs established in 1985